Ritz or The Ritz may refer to:

Facilities and structures

Hotels
 The Ritz Hotel, London, a hotel in London, England
 Hôtel Ritz Paris, a hotel in Paris, France
 Hotel Ritz (Madrid), a hotel in Madrid, Spain
 Hotel Ritz (Lisbon), a hotel in Lisbon, Portugal
 The Ritz-Carlton Hotel Company, parent company to the Ritz-Carlton hotel chain
 Ritz-Carlton Atlantic City, a former hotel in New Jersey, United States
 The Ritz-Carlton Millenia Singapore, a hotel in Singapore
 Ritz-Carlton Montreal, a hotel in Montreal, Canada
 Ritz-Carlton Tokyo, a hotel in Roppongi, Tokyo, Japan
 Ritz-Carlton Hotel (New York City), a former hotel in New York City
 Ritz-Carlton, Riyadh, a hotel in Riyadh, Saudi Arabia
 Ritz Beach Club, a former beach resort in South Andros, Andros, Bahamas

Other structures
 Ritz (Austin, Texas), a historic theater
 Ritz Cinema (disambiguation)
 Ritz Theatre (disambiguation)
 Ritz Tower, a residential building in New York City
 The Ritz (Manchester), a Manchester, England Rock club, in which Ian Gillan and The Charlatans have both recorded
 The Ritz (rock club), a New York City Rock club that existed in the 1980s and early 1990s

People
 César Ritz (1850–1918), hotelier
 Charles Ritz (1891–1976), son of César Ritz
 Glenda Ritz (born 1954), Indiana politician
 Walther Ritz (1878–1909), theoretical physicist
 Rosalie Ritz (1923–2008), pioneering courtroom artist
 David Ritz (born c. 1942), author
 Gerry Ritz (born 1951), Canadian federal politician
 Ritz Brothers, comedy team from the 1920s through the 1960s
 Dathan Ritzenhein (born 1982), American distance runner and Olympian, often referred to as "Ritz"
 Rittz (Jonathan McCollum; born 1980), American rapper
 DiDa Ritz, American drag queen

Fictional characters
 Fritzi Ritz, a major character in the long-running comic strip Nancy (comic strip).
 Ritz Malheur, a fictional character in Final Fantasy Tactics Advance

Music
 "Ritz", a rock song on The Psychomodo album by Steve Harley & Cockney Rebel
 The Ritz (quartet), a barbershop quartet that won the International Championship in 1991

Television, theatre, films
 The Ritz (film), the 1976 film version of the play
 The Ritz (play), a 1975 Broadway play by Terrence McNally
 The Ritz (TV series), a 1987 BBC television series

Other uses
 Ritz (cigarette), a Portuguese brand
 Ritz (crater), a lunar impact crater located on the far side of the moon
 Ritz Camera & Image, in the United States
 Ritz Crackers, a brand of snack crackers
 Ritz Metro, a Mexican snack
 Ritz Newspaper, sometimes Ritz Magazine, a defunct UK fashion and gossip periodical
 Ritz Video, a chain of video rental stores in the United Kingdom that was bought out by Blockbuster
 Maruti Suzuki Ritz, the Indian version of the Suzuki Splash, a hatchback city car
 Rydberg–Ritz combination principle
 Ritz method (mathematics)

See also

 Puttin' On the Ritz (disambiguation)
 
 
 Rytz, a Swiss surname
 Writs